Raj Shah (born c. 1985) is an American political aide who served as the White House Deputy Press Secretary and Deputy Assistant to the President from 2017 to 2019. Prior to joining the Trump Administration, Shah was in charge of opposition research at the Republican National Committee. In July 2019, Fox Corporation announced he had joined the company as a senior vice president.

Early life 
Shah's parents immigrated to the US from Mumbai. He was born and raised in Connecticut, where his father worked as an engineer and his mother as a dentist.

Shah attended Brien McMahon High School, and was named an Ettinger Scholar in Norwalk, Connecticut. He studied government at Cornell University, and received his bachelor's degree in 2006.

Career
Shah volunteered in Bridgeport for U.S. Congressman Chris Shays (R-CT) during high school and interned for U.S. Senator Joe Lieberman (D-CT) and others in Washington, D.C. as his interest in politics developed. He found he was disagreeing with Democrats in his family and those he met during internships, Raj cast his first vote for George W. Bush in 2004, and interned in the White House in 2005. While working as a campaign spokesman for New Mexico Republican gubernatorial candidate Susana Martinez in 2010, Shah was arrested for DWI and reckless driving, and was immediately terminated from his position.

By the 2012 presidential election cycle, Shah was deputy research director at the Republican National Committee and he said in that job that he learned what not to do in the 2016 election. He worked with the campaign staff and manager of the Mitt Romney campaign and others to plan how to defeat Hillary Clinton well before she announced her candidacy. Shah was a co-founder of America Rising, "a right-leaning political action committee that produces opposition research on Democratic candidates". The playbook on the Clinton campaign was
very deep, it's very broad. We had the time and resources to dig through it all and kind of pick and choose how we wanted to go about the general election. I think it played to our benefit. When the email issue broke, we knew what buttons to push. When issues surrounding the foundation came up we knew where to look. We filed over 550 FOI requests and we sued the government half a dozen times to release records. All these sorts of things were years in the making. It was a huge coordinated effort.

As head of opposition research in the Republican National Committee (RNC) in 2016, Shah led a team of experts to carry out research against Hillary Clinton. Shah was behind the anti-Clinton campaign during the campaign. Then-incoming White House Chief of Staff and outgoing head of the RNC Reince Priebus said that Shah would be among the key leaders in helping to implement the President-elect's agenda and bringing change. Prior to the election, Shah called Trump "deplorable" and remarked that the release of the Donald Trump Access Hollywood tape was "some justice"; he also helped get embarrassing footage of Trump to use in a Jeb Bush commercial for the latter's campaign.

Shah was one of the early staffers on duty in the White House on Inauguration Day, attending to reporters' inquiries and beginning establishment of the communications apparatus (emails of 'OCIO' distributions of the address and the first White House pool report were early to go out) in the West Wing and the Eisenhower Executive Office Building.

Shah left the White House in January 2019. Fox Corporation announced in July 2019 that he had joined the company as a senior vice president. The New York Times reported in 2020 that he had been tasked with running a project to discredit critics of Fox News.

See also
 Indians in the New York City metropolitan area

References

External links

 
1980s births
Living people
American civil servants
American politicians of Indian descent
Connecticut Republicans
Asian-American people in Connecticut politics
Cornell University alumni
Trump administration personnel
Asian conservatism in the United States